Electrolysis of water, also known as  water splitting, is the process of using electricity to decompose water into oxygen and hydrogen gas by electrolysis. Hydrogen gas released in this way can be used as hydrogen fuel, or remixed with the oxygen to create oxyhydrogen gas, for use in welding and other applications.

Water electrolysis requires a minimum potential difference of 1.23 volts, although at that voltage external heat is also required.  Typically 1.5 volts are provided. Electrolysis is rare in industrial applications since hydrogen can be produced less expensively from fossil fuels.

History

In 1789, Jan Rudolph Deiman and Adriaan Paets van Troostwijk used an electrostatic machine to make electricity that was discharged on gold electrodes in a Leyden jar. In 1800 Alessandro Volta invented the voltaic pile, while a few weeks later English scientists William Nicholson and Anthony Carlisle used it to electrolyse water. In 1806 Humphry Davy reported the results of extensive distilled water electrolysis experiments, concluding that nitric acid was produced at the anode from dissolved atmospheric nitrogen. He used a high voltage battery and non-reactive electrodes and vessels such as gold electrode cones that doubled as vessels bridged by damp asbestos. Zénobe Gramme invented the Gramme machine in 1869, making electrolysis a cheap method for hydrogen production. A method of industrial synthesis of hydrogen and oxygen through electrolysis was developed by Dmitry Lachinov in 1888.

Principles
A DC electrical power source is connected to two electrodes, or two plates (typically made from an inert metal such as platinum or iridium) that are placed in the water. Hydrogen appears at the cathode (where electrons enter the water), and oxygen at the anode. Assuming ideal faradaic efficiency, the amount of hydrogen generated is twice the amount of oxygen, and both are proportional to the total electrical charge conducted by the solution. However, in many cells competing side reactions occur, resulting in additional products and less than ideal faradaic efficiency.

Electrolysis of pure water requires excess energy in the form of overpotential to overcome various activation barriers. Without the excess energy, electrolysis occurs slowly or not at all. This is in part due to the limited self-ionization of water. 

Pure water has an electrical conductivity about one-millionth that of seawater. 

Many electrolytic cells lack requisite electrocatalysts. Efficiency is increased through the addition of an electrolyte (such as a salt, an acid or a base) and electrocatalysts.

Equations

In pure water at the negatively charged cathode, a reduction reaction takes place, with electrons (e−) from the cathode given to hydrogen cations to form hydrogen gas. The half reactions, balanced with acid, are:

Reduction at cathode 
2H+(aq) + 2e− → H2(g)

At the positively charged anode, an oxidation reaction occurs, generating oxygen gas and giving electrons to the anode to complete the circuit:

Oxidation at anode 
2 H2O(l) → O2(g) + 4 H+(aq) + 4e−

The same half-reactions can be balanced with the base as listed below. Not all half-reactions must be balanced with acid or base. Many do, like the listed oxidation or reduction of water. Half reactions must be balanced with either acid or base. Acid-balanced reactions predominate in acidic (low pH) solutions, while base-balanced reactions predominate in basic (high pH) solutions.

Combining either half reaction pair yields the same overall decomposition of water into oxygen and hydrogen:

Overall reaction: 2 H2O(l) → 2 H2(g) + O2(g)

The number of hydrogen molecules produced is twice the number of oxygen molecules. Assuming equal temperature and pressure for both gases, the produced hydrogen gas has, therefore, twice the volume of the produced oxygen gas. The number of electrons pushed through the water is twice the number of generated hydrogen molecules and four times the number of generated oxygen molecules.

Thermodynamics

The decomposition of pure water into hydrogen and oxygen at standard temperature and pressure is not favorable in thermodynamic terms.

Thus, the standard potential of the water electrolysis cell (Eocell = Eocathode − Eoanode) is -1.229 V at 25 °C at pH 0 ([H+] = 1.0 M). At 25 °C with pH 7 ([H+] = 1.0 M), the potential is unchanged based on the Nernst equation. The thermodynamic standard cell potential can be obtained from standard-state free energy calculations to find ΔG° and then using the equation: ΔG°= −n F E° (where E° is the cell potential and F the Faraday constant, i.e. 96,485.3321233 C/mol). For two water molecules electrolysed and hence two hydrogen molecules formed, n = 4, and 

 ΔG° = 474.48 kJ/2 mol(water) = 237.24 kJ/mol(water)
 ΔS° = 163 J/K mol(water)
 ΔH° = 571.66 kJ/2 mol(water) = 285.83 kJ/mol(water)
 and 141.86 kJ/g(H2). 

However, calculations regarding individual electrode equilibrium potentials requires corrections to account for the activity coefficients. In practice when an electrochemical cell is "driven" toward completion by applying reasonable potential, it is kinetically controlled. Therefore, activation energy, ion mobility (diffusion) and concentration, wire resistance, surface hindrance including bubble formation (blocks electrode area), and entropy, require greater potential to overcome. The amount of increase in required potential is termed the overpotential.

Electrolyte 

Electrolysis in pure water consumes/reduces H+ cations at the cathode and consumes/oxidizes hydroxide (OH−) anions at the anode. This can be verified by adding a pH indicator to the water: Water near the cathode is basic while water near the anode is acidic. The hydroxides OH− that approach the anode mostly combine with the positive hydronium ions (H3O+) to form water. The positive hydronium ions that approach the cathode mostly combine with negative hydroxide ions to form water. Relatively few hydroniums/hydroxide ions reach the cathode/anode. This can cause overpotential at both electrodes.

Pure water has a charge carrier density similar to semiconductors since it has a low autoionization, Kw = 1.0×10−14 at room temperature and thus pure water conducts current poorly, 0.055 µS·cm−1. Unless a large potential is applied to increase the autoionization of water, electrolysis of pure water proceeds slowly, limited by the overall conductivity.

An aqueous electrolyte can considerably raise conductivity. The electrolyte disassociates into cations and anions; the anions rush towards the anode and neutralize the buildup of positively charged H+ there; similarly, the cations rush towards the cathode and neutralize the buildup of negatively charged OH− there. This allows the continuous flow of electricity.

Anions from the electrolyte compete with the hydroxide ions to give up an electron. An electrolyte anion with less standard electrode potential than hydroxide will be oxidized instead of the hydroxide, producing no oxygen gas. Likewise, a cation with a greater standard electrode potential than a hydrogen ion will be reduced instead of hydrogen.

Various cations have lower electrode potential than H+ and are therefore suitable for use as electrolyte cations: Li+, Rb+, K+, Cs+, Ba2+, Sr2+, Ca2+, Na+, and Mg2+. Sodium and lithium are common choices, as they form inexpensive, soluble salts.

If an acid is used as the electrolyte, the cation is H+, and no competitor for the H+ is created by disassociating water. The most commonly used anion is sulfate, as it is difficult to oxidize. The standard potential for oxidation of this ion to the peroxydisulfate ion is +2.010 volts.

Strong acids such as sulfuric acid (H2SO4), and strong bases such as potassium hydroxide (KOH), and sodium hydroxide (NaOH) are common choices as electrolytes due to their strong conducting abilities.

A solid polymer electrolyte can be used such as Nafion and when applied with an appropriate catalyst on each side of the membrane can efficiently electrolyze with as little as 1.5  volts. Several commercial electrolysis systems use solid electrolytes.

Pure water 
Electrolyte-free pure water electrolysis has been achieved via deep-sub-Debye-length nanogap electrochemical cells. When the gap  between cathode and anode are smaller than Debye-length (1 micron in pure water, around 220 nm in distilled water), the double layer regions from two electrodes can overlap, leading to a uniformly high electric field distributed across the entire gap. Such a high electric field can significantly enhance ion transport (mainly due to migration), further enhancing self-ionization, continuing the reaction and showing little resistance between the two electrodes. In this case, the two half-reactions are coupled and limited by electron-transfer steps (the electrolysis current is saturated at shorter electrode distances).

Seawater 
Ambient seawater presents challenges overbecause of the presence of salt and other impurities. Approaches may or may not involve desalination before electrolysis. Traditional electrolysis produces toxic and corrosive chlorine ions (e.g.,  and ). Multiple methods have been advanced for electrolying unprocessed seawater. Typical proton exchange membrane (PEM) electrolysers require desalination.

Techniques
As of 2022, commercial electrolysis requires around 53 kWh of electricity to produce one kg of hydrogen, which holds 33.6 kWh of energy.

Fundamental demonstration
Two leads, running from the terminals of a battery, placed in a cup of water with a quantity of electrolyte establish conductivity. Using NaCl (salt) in an electrolyte solution yields chlorine gas rather than oxygen due to a competing half-reaction. Sodium bicarbonate (baking soda) instead yields hydrogen, and carbon dioxide for as long as the bicarbonate anion stays in solution.

Hofmann voltameter

The Hofmann voltameter is a small-scale electrolytic cell. It consists of three joined upright cylinders. The inner cylinder is open at the top to allow the addition of water and electrolyte. A platinum electrode (plate or honeycomb) is placed at the bottom of each of the two side cylinders, connected to the terminals of an electricity source. The generated gases displace water and collect at the top of the two outer tubes, where it can be drawn off with a stopcock.

High-pressure 

High-pressure electrolysis involves compressed hydrogen output around 12–20 MPa (120–200 Bar, 1740–2900 psi). By pressurising the hydrogen in the electrolyser, the need for an external hydrogen compressor is eliminated. The average energy consumption is around 3%.

High-temperature 

High-temperature electrolysis (also HTE or steam electrolysis) is more efficient at higher temperatures. A heat engine supplies some of the energy, which is typically cheaper than electricity

Polymer electrolyte membrane 

A proton-exchange membrane electrolyser separates reactants and transports protons while blocking a direct electronic pathway through the membrane. PEM fuel cells use a solid polymer membrane (a thin plastic film) which is permeable to hydrogen ions (protons) when it is saturated with water, but does not conduct electrons.

It uses a proton-exchange membrane, or polymer-electrolyte membrane (PEM), which is a semipermeable membrane generally made from ionomers and designed to conduct protons while acting as an insulator and reactant barrier, e.g. to oxygen and hydrogen gas. PEM fuel cells use a solid polymer membrane (a thin plastic film) that is permeable to protons when saturated with water, but does not conduct electrons. Proton-exchange membranes are primarily characterized by proton conductivity (σ), methanol permeability (P), and thermal stability.

PEMs can be made from either pure polymer or from composite membranes, where other materials are embedded in a polymer matrix. One of the most common commercially available materials is the fluoropolymer (PFSA) Nafion. Nafion is an ionomer with a perfluorinated backbone such as Teflon. Many other structural motifs are used to make ionomers for proton-exchange membranes. Many use polyaromatic polymers, while others use partially fluorinated polymers.

Supercritical water 
Supercritical water electrolysis (SWE) uses water in a supercritical state. Supercritical water requires less energy, therefore reducing costs. It operates at >375 °C, which reduces thermodynamic barriers and increases kinetics, improving ionic conductivity over liquid or gaseous water, which reduces ohmic losses. Benefits include improved electrical efficiency, >221bar pressurised delivery of product gases, ability to operate at high current densities and low dependence on precious metal catalysts. As of 2021 commercial SWE equipment was not available.

Nickel/iron 
In 2014, researchers announced electrolysis using nickel and iron catalysts rather than precious metals. Nickel-metal/nickel-oxide structure is more active than nickel metal or nickel oxide alone. The catalyst significantly lowers the required voltage. Nickel–iron batteries are under investigation for use as combined batteries and electrolysers. Those "battolysers" could be charged and discharged like conventional batteries, and would produce hydrogen when fully charged.

In 2023, researchers in Austalia announced the use of a porous sheet of nitrogen-doped nickel molybdenum phosphide catalyst. The nitrogen doping increases conductivity and optimizes electronic density and surface chemistry. This produces additional catalytic sites. The  nitrogen bonds to the surface metals and has electro-negative properties that help exclude unwanted ions and molecules, while phosphate, sulfate, nitrate and hydroxyl surface ions block chorine and prevent corrosion.10 mA cm−2 can be achieved using 1.52 and 1.55 V in alkaline electrolyte and seawater, respectively.

Nanogap electrochemical cells 
In 2017, researchers reported nanogap electrochemical cells that achieved high-efficiency electrolyte-free pure water electrolysis at ambient temperature. In these cells, the two electrodes are so close to each other (smaller than Debye-length) that the mass transport rate can be higher than the electron-transfer rate, leading to two half-reactions coupled together and limited by the electron-transfer step. Experiments show that the electrical current density can be larger than that from 1  mol/L sodium hydroxide solution. Its "Virtual Breakdown Mechanism", is completely different from traditional electrochemical theory, due to such nanogap size effects.

Capillary fed 
A capillary-fed electrolyzer cell is claimed to require only 41.5 kWh to produce 1 kg of hydrogen. The water electrolyte is isolated from the electrodes by a porous, hydrophilic separator. The water is drawn into the electrolyzer by capillary action, while the electrolyzed gases pass out on either side. It extends PEM technology by eliminating bubbles that reduce the contact between the electrodes and the electrolyte, reducing efficiency. The design is claimed to operate at 98% energy efficiency. The design forgoes water circulation, separator tanks, and other mechanism and can be air- or radiatively cooled.

Applications 
About five percent of hydrogen gas produced worldwide is created by electrolysis. Currently, most industrial methods produce hydrogen from natural gas instead, in the steam reforming process. The majority of the hydrogen produced through electrolysis is a side product in the production of chlorine and caustic soda. This is a prime example of a competing for side reaction.

2NaCl + 2H2O → Cl2 + H2 + 2NaOH

In the chloralkali process (electrolysis of brine) a water/sodium chloride mixture is only half the electrolysis of water since the chloride ions are oxidized to chlorine rather than water being oxidized to oxygen. Thermodynamically, this would not be expected since the oxidation potential of the chloride ion is less than that of water, but the rate of the chloride reaction is much greater than that of water, causing it to predominate. The hydrogen produced from this process is either burned (converting it back to water), used for the production of specialty chemicals, or various other small-scale applications.

Water electrolysis is also used to generate oxygen for the International Space Station.

Additionally, many car companies have recently begun researching using water as a fuel source, converting it into hydrogen and oxygen via water electrolysis, and using the hydrogen as fuel in a Hydrogen vehicle, however, have not met much success due to the unstable characteristics of hydrogen as a fuel source.

Many industrial electrolysis cells are similar to Hofmann voltameters, with platinum plates or honeycombs as electrodes. Generally, hydrogen is produced for point of use applications such as oxyhydrogen torches or when high purity hydrogen or oxygen is desired. The vast majority of hydrogen is produced from hydrocarbons and as a result, contains trace amounts of carbon monoxide among other impurities. The carbon monoxide impurity can be detrimental to various systems including many fuel cells.

Efficiency

Industrial output 

Efficiency of modern hydrogen generators is measured by energy consumed per standard volume of hydrogen (MJ/m3), assuming standard temperature and pressure of the H2. The lower the energy used by a generator, the higher its efficiency would be; a 100%-efficient electrolyser would consume  (higher heating value) of hydrogen, . Practical electrolysis (using a rotating electrolyser at 15 bar pressure) may consume , and a further  if the hydrogen is compressed for use in hydrogen cars.

Electrolyzer vendors provide efficiencies based on enthalpy. To assess the claimed efficiency of an electrolyzer it is important to establish how it was defined by the vendor (i.e. what enthalpy value, what current density, etc.).

There are three main technologies available on the market: alkaline, solid oxide, and proton exchange membrane (PEM) electrolyzers.
Alkaline electrolyzers are cheaper in terms of investment (they generally use nickel catalysts), but least efficient. PEM electrolyzers are more expensive (they generally use expensive platinum-group metal catalysts) but are more efficient and can operate at higher current densities, and can, therefore, be possibly cheaper if the hydrogen production is large enough. Solid oxide electrolyzer cells (SOEC) are the third most common type of electrolysis, and use high operating temperatures to increase efficiency. The theoretical electrical efficiency of SOEC is close to 100% at 90% hydrogen production. Degradation of the system over time does not affect the efficiency of SOEC electrolyzers initially unlike PEM and alkaline electrolyzers. As the SOEC system degrades, the cell voltage increases, producing more heat in the system naturally. Due to this, less energy is required to keep the system hot, which will make up for the energy losses from dramatic degradation initially.

Conventional alkaline electrolysis has an efficiency of about 70%. Accounting for the accepted use of the higher heating value (because inefficiency via heat can be redirected back into the system to create the steam required by the catalyst), average working efficiencies for PEM electrolysis are around 80%. This is expected to increase to between 82 and 86% before 2030. Theoretical efficiency for PEM electrolysers are predicted up to 94%.

Considering the industrial production of hydrogen, and using current best processes for water electrolysis (PEM or alkaline electrolysis) which have an effective electrical efficiency of 70–80%, producing 1 kg of hydrogen (which has a specific energy of 143 MJ/kg) requires  of electricity. At an electricity cost of $0.06/kW·h, as set out in the US Department of Energy hydrogen production targets for 2015, the hydrogen cost is $3/kg. Equipment cost depends on mass production. , different analysts predict annual manufacture of equipment by 2030 as 47 GW, 104 GW and 180 GW, respectively.

With the range of natural gas prices from 2016 as shown in the graph (Hydrogen Production Tech Team Roadmap, November 2017) putting the cost of steam-methane-reformed (SMR) hydrogen at between $1.20 and $1.50, the cost price of hydrogen via electrolysis is still over double 2015 DOE hydrogen target prices. The US DOE target price for hydrogen in 2020 is $2.30/kg, requiring an electricity cost of $0.037/kW·h, which is achievable given 2018 PPA tenders for wind and solar in many regions. This puts the $4/gasoline gallon equivalent (gge) H2 dispensed objective well within reach, and close to a slightly elevated natural gas production cost for SMR.

In other parts of the world, the price of SMR hydrogen is between $1–3/kg on average. This makes production of hydrogen via electrolysis cost competitive in many regions already, as outlined by Nel Hydrogen and others, including an article by the IEA examining the conditions which could lead to a competitive advantage for electrolysis. The large price increase of gas during the 2021–2022 global energy crisis made hydrogen electrolysis economic in some parts of the world.

Some large industrial electrolyzers are operating at several megawatts. , the largest is a 150 MW alkaline facility in Ningxia, China, with a capacity up to 23,000 tonnes per year. While higher-efficiency Western electrolysis equipment can cost $1,200/kW, lower-efficiency Chinese equipment can cost $300/kW, but with a lower lifetime of 60,000 hours.

Overpotential 
Real water electrolyzers require higher voltages for the reaction to proceed. The part that exceeds 1.23 V is called overpotential or overvoltage, and represents any kind of loss and nonideality in the electrochemical process.

For a well designed cell the largest overpotential is the reaction overpotential for the four-electron oxidation of water to oxygen at the anode; electrocatalysts can facilitate this reaction, and platinum alloys are the state of the art for this oxidation. Developing a cheap, effective electrocatalyst for this reaction would be a great advance, and is a topic of current research; there are many approaches, among them a 30-year-old recipe for molybdenum sulfide, graphene quantum dots, carbon nanotubes, perovskite, and nickel/nickel-oxide. Tri‐molybdenum phosphide (Mo3P) has been recently found as a promising nonprecious metal and earth‐abundant candidate with outstanding catalytic properties that can be used for electrocatalytic processes. The catalytic performance of Mo3P nanoparticles is tested in the hydrogen evolution reaction (HER), indicating an onset potential of as low as 21 mV, H2 formation rate, and exchange current density of 214.7 µmol s−1 g−1 cat (at only 100 mV overpotential) and 279.07 µA cm−2, respectively, which are among the closest values yet observed to platinum. The simpler two-electron reaction to produce hydrogen at the cathode can be electrocatalyzed with almost no overpotential by platinum, or in theory a hydrogenase enzyme. If other, less effective, materials are used for the cathode (e.g. graphite), large overpotentials will appear.

Thermodynamics 
The electrolysis of water in standard conditions requires a theoretical minimum of 237 kJ of electrical energy input to dissociate each mole of water, which is the standard Gibbs free energy of formation of water. It also requires energy to overcome the change in entropy of the reaction. Therefore, the process cannot proceed below 286 kJ per mol if no external heat/energy is added.

Since each mole of water requires two moles of electrons, and given that the Faraday constant F represents the charge of a mole of electrons (96485 C/mol), it follows that the minimum voltage necessary for electrolysis is about 1.23 V. If electrolysis is carried out at high temperature, this voltage reduces. This effectively allows the electrolyser to operate at more than 100% electrical efficiency. In electrochemical systems this means that heat must be supplied to the reactor to sustain the reaction. In this way thermal energy can be used for part of the electrolysis energy requirement. In a similar way the required voltage can be reduced (below 1 V) if fuels (such as carbon, alcohol, biomass) are reacted with water (PEM based electrolyzer in low temperature) or oxygen ions (solid oxide electrolyte based electrolyzer in high temperature). This results in some of the fuel's energy being used to "assist" the electrolysis process and can reduce the overall cost of hydrogen produced.

However, observing the entropy component (and other losses), voltages over 1.48 V are required for the reaction to proceed at practical current densities (the thermoneutral voltage).

In the case of water electrolysis, Gibbs free energy represents the minimum work necessary for the reaction to proceed, and the reaction enthalpy is the amount of energy (both work and heat) that has to be provided so the reaction products are at the same temperature as the reactant (i.e. standard temperature for the values given above). Potentially, an electrolyzer operating at 1.48 V would operate isothermally at a temperature of 25 C as the electrical energy supplied would be equal to the enthalpy (heat) of water decomposition and this would require 20% more electrical energy than the minimum.

See also

Electrocatalyst
Electrochemistry
Electrochemical cell
Electrochemical engineering
Electrolysis
Gas cracker
Hydrogen production
Methane pyrolysis (for Hydrogen)
Noryl
Photoelectrolysis of water
Photocatalytic water splitting
Electrochemical reduction of carbon dioxide
Timeline of hydrogen technologies
Water purification

References

External links

EERE 2008 – 100 kgH2/day Trade Study
NREL 2006 – Electrolysis technical report

Electrolysis
Hydrogen production
Industrial gases
Water chemistry